Romantica is the sixth album by American alternative rock band Luna, released in 2002.

Production
The album was produced and mixed by Gene Holder and Dave Fridmann.

Critical reception
Exclaim! wrote that "there are some subtle advancements here, like the overall production style of knob-twister Dave Fridman [sic], who has isolated Wareham's languorous vocals more dramatically than on any previous release."

Track listing
All lyrics by Dean Wareham, music by Luna, except where noted.

 "Lovedust" – 4:00
 "Weird and Woozy" – 3:12
 "Black Postcards" – 5:12
 "Black Champagne" (lyrics by Sean Eden, Wareham) – 3:34
 "Swedish Fish" – 2:54
 "Renée Is Crying" – 3:13
 "Mermaid Eyes" – 3:31
 "1995" – 2:17
 "Rememories" (lyrics by Eden, Wareham) – 4:26
 "Dizzy" – 3:37
 "Orange Peel" – 3:11
 "Romantica" – 5:12

References

Luna (1990s American band) albums
2002 albums
Albums produced by Dave Fridmann
Jetset Records albums